August Vomm may refer to:
 August Vomm (politician) (1893–1941), Estonian politician  
 August Vomm (sculptor) (1906–1976), Estonian sculptor